PBX 1 is the first studio album by Sidhu Moose Wala, released on 18 October 2018, by T-Series. The album was produced by Byg Byrd, Intense, Snappy, and Harj Nagra. Along with the album, Moose Wala also released a music video for "Jatt Da Muqabla", directed by TDot Films.

Track listing

Chart performance 

The album debuted at number 66 on the Billboard Canadian Albums Chart. The album reached the top spot on iTunes and became the top Indian Pop album. The songs "Jatt Da Muqabala", "Badfella" and "Dawood" were ranked No. 11, 24, and 26 on UK Asian Music Chart by OCC. Songs "Jatt Da Muqabala", "Badfella" and "Selfmade" also featured in Apple Music 2010s Punjabi essentials playlist.

Charts

Songs

Accolades 

 Best Album - Brit Asia Music Awards

References

External links

Sidhu Moose Wala albums
2018 debut albums